The Science, Engineering & Technology Student of the Year Awards (SET Awards) were presented to outstanding undergraduate students in the United Kingdom yearly between 1998 and 2013. The award was open to students who were on a first-degree course at a university located within the United Kingdom of Great Britain and Northern Ireland, as well as students from the Republic of Ireland. The awards were presented at a dinner in London among technology students, academics, industry executives, government leaders, and the media.

Categories 
Awards reflected the range of Science, Engineering & Technology degrees offered by UK and Irish universities. Each award was sponsored by a company, professional body, or other organisation with a particular interest in the field of the award.
 Best Aeronautical Engineering Student
 Best Biology & Biotechnology Student
 Best Chemical Engineering Student
 Best Chemistry Student
 Best Civil Engineering Student
 Best Computational Science Student
 Best Food, Nutrition & Health Student
 Best Electronic Engineering Student
 Best Information Technology Student
 Best Maritime Technology Student
 Best Materials Student
 Best Mathematics Student
 Best Mechanical Engineering Student
 Best Pharmacology Student
 Best Physics Student

The highest scoring student overall was declared the "Science, Engineering and Technology Student of the Year".

References

External links
 

British science and technology awards
Awards established in 1998
Student awards